Hubert Sauper (born 27 July 1966) is an Austrian  documentary filmmaker, director, writer, producer, and actor best known for the highly controversial Darwin's Nightmare (2004) which was nominated for an Academy Award.

Sauper has lived in the UK, Italy, and the United States and now lives in France. He studied film directing in universities in Vienna and France. He teaches film classes in Europe and the USA.

Sauper is famed for his political documentary films, shot in cinema verite style. He earned worldwide recognition for his film's expression, content, and aesthetics. His films are usually controversial for their explicit political, social, and poetic expression. Sauper's film Darwin's Nightmare was nominated for best documentary at the Oscars, and he has been awarded for his work with more than 50 international film prizes. His two latest documentaries have received twelve International Film Prizes.

He acted in several short films and two feature-length films: In The Circle Of The Iris, directed by Peter Patzak, (with Philippe Léotard), and Blue Distance, directed by Peter Schreiner.

Hubert Sauper is also a member of: Academy of Motion Picture Arts and Sciences, European Film Academy, and Academie Francaise du Cinema.

He has taught as a visiting professor/tutor at Harvard, Yale, UCLA, Columbia University, Colorado University, Universidad de Caracas, Universidad de la Havana, FEMIS (French film school), Moscow International Film School, Istanbul University, and Southern Mediterranean Cinema School.

Early life and childhood
Sauper born in the Tyrolean Alps, Austria in 1966 as son of inn keepers, musicians. His father, Anton Hubertus Sauper is a writer and painter. Maria, his mother, is a passionate singer and works occasionally on humanitarian missions in the Balkans. Sauper has spent his adult life in Italy, Southern California - USA, Great Britain, Tanzania, Zaire (now DR Congo) Sudan, South Sudan.  His permanent home is since 1995 in Paris and Burgundy, France.

Education
Sauper studied photography in the US, then film directing at the University of Fine Arts in Vienna, and the Universite de Paris. He was also a guest student at the FEMIS after receiving an ERASMUS grant. His Cinema thesis, published in Vienna, was entitled: "Film as testament", and focused on the three last films of the directors Cyril Collard, Andrey Tarkovsky, and Joris Ivens ("Die Verdichtung"). Sauper graduated with a special mention as director from film school, receiving a Bachelor of Arts.

Filmography
On the Road With Emil (1993, Documentary)
So I Sleepwalk In Broad Daylight (1994, fiction)
Lomographer's Moscow (1995, Documentary)
Kisangani Diary / Loin du Rwanda (Far From Rwanda) (1998, Documentary)
Alone With Our Stories (2000, Documentary)
Darwin's Nightmare (2004, Documentary)
We Come as Friends (2014, Documentary)
Epicentro (2020, Documentary)

Awards

External links

Hubert Sauper, "Giving Voice to Those Who Are Not Heard" (Video interview from Capturing Reality: The Art of Documentary)
Interview with Hubert Sauper, co-director of Kisangani Diary "We cannot call ourselves democrats when people are still treated like animals" with Stefan Steinberg on the World Socialist Web Site
"Darwin's Nightmare" (Review from Rotten Tomatoes)
"Darwin's Nightmare" (Review from New York Times)
"Darwin's Nightmare" (Site)
Hubert Sauper IMDB  (Site)

1966 births
Living people
European Film Awards winners (people)
People from Kitzbühel
Austrian film directors
Austrian documentary filmmakers
Sundance Film Festival award winners